The 1990 Holy Cross Crusaders football team was an American football team that represented the College of the Holy Cross during the 1990 NCAA Division I-AA football season. Holy Cross finished first in the newly renamed Patriot League, for its fourth championship in five years of league play. 

In their fifth year under head coach Mark Duffner, the Crusaders compiled a 9–1–1 record. Willie Bradford, Craig Callahan, Joe Foy and Mark Gallagher were the team captains.

The Crusaders outscored opponents 339 to 106. Their undefeated (5–0) conference record placed first in the six-team Patriot League standings. This was the first year of competition under the Patriot League banner; the league had been known as the Colonial League since 1986.

The Crusaders were ranked No. 4 in the preseason national Division I-AA rankings, but a 0–1–1 start dropped them out of the top 20 in the first round of in-season rankings. They later returned to the top 20 during their nine-game win streak to finish the season, and were recognized as No. 8 in the final poll, released after their last game. The Crusaders did not participate in the Division I-AA playoffs, as Patriot League rules at the time forbade postseason play.

Holy Cross played its home games at Fitton Field on the college campus in Worcester, Massachusetts.

Schedule

References

Holy Cross
Holy Cross Crusaders football seasons
Patriot League football champion seasons
Holy Cross Crusaders football